Sir William Benjamin Bowring, 1st Baronet (13 February 1837 – 20 October 1916), was a British shipowner, local politician and benefactor.

Bowring was a senior partner of C. T. Bowring & Company, shipowners, and served as Lord Mayor of Liverpool between 1893 and 1894. He gave Bowring Park, Knowsley, to the city of Liverpool in 1906 and was created a baronet, of Beechwood in the Parish of Grassendale in the County Palatine of Lancaster, on 23 July 1907. He died in October 1916, aged 79, when the title became extinct.

He was the son of Charles Tricks Bowring and grandson of Benjamin Bowring and brother of Charles R. Bowring of Newfoundland.

References

1837 births
1916 deaths
Baronets in the Baronetage of the United Kingdom
Politicians from St. John's, Newfoundland and Labrador
Mayors of Liverpool
Liberal Unionist Party parliamentary candidates